Lushavel Stickland (born 8 March 1998) is a Samoan swimmer. She competed in the women's 50 metre freestyle and women's 100 metre backstroke events at the 2019 World Aquatics Championships held in Gwangju, South Korea. In both events she did not advance to compete in the semi-finals. In 2019, she also competed at the 2019 Pacific Games held in Samoa.

References

External links
 

1998 births
Living people
Samoan female swimmers
Place of birth missing (living people)
Swimmers at the 2018 Commonwealth Games
Swimmers at the 2022 Commonwealth Games
Commonwealth Games competitors for Samoa
Samoan female freestyle swimmers
Female backstroke swimmers